The Macintosh Performa is a family of personal computers designed, manufactured and sold by Apple Computer, Inc. from 1992 to  1997.  The Performa brand re-used models from Apple's Quadra, Centris, LC, and Power Macintosh families with model numbers that denoted included software packages or hard drive sizes. Whereas non-Performa Macintosh computers were sold by Apple Authorized Resellers, the Performa was sold through big-box stores and mass-market retailers such as Good Guys, Circuit City, and Sears.

The initial series of models consisted of the Macintosh Classic II-based Performa 200, the LC II-based Performa 400, and the IIvi-based Performa 600. After releasing a total of sixty-four different models, Apple retired the Performa brand in early 1997, shortly after release of the Power Macintosh 5500, 6500, 8600 and 9600, as well as the return of Steve Jobs to the company. The Performa brand's lifespan coincided with a period of significant financial turmoil at Apple due in part to low sales of Performa machines.

Overview 

With a strong education market share throughout the 1980s, Apple wanted to push its computers into the home, with the idea that a child would experience the same Macintosh computer both in the home and at school, and later grow to use Macintosh computers at work.  In the early 1990s, Apple sold computers through a chain of authorized resellers, and through mail order catalogs such as those found in the latter third of MacWorld Magazine. A typical reseller sold Macintosh computers to professionals, who purchased high-level applications and required performance and expansion capabilities. Consumers, however, purchased computers based on the best value, and weren't as concerned about expansion or performance. To reach these customers, Apple wanted to sell their computers through department store chains (such as Sears), but this would conflict with existing authorized reseller agreements, in which a geographic area had only one reseller.

To prevent these conflicts, Apple split the Macintosh line into professional and consumer models. The professional line included the Classic, LC, Centris, Quadra, and Power Macintosh lines, and continued to be sold as-is (i.e., no consumer software bundles or limited features). The consumer line was given the name "Performa", and included computers similar to the professional line. Early Performa models were not sold with the "Macintosh" brand in order to get around the authorized reseller agreements.

The Performa line was marketed differently from the professional line. To satisfy consumer-level budgets, the computers were sold bundled with home and small business applications. Most models were also bundled with a keyboard, mouse, an external modem and either a dot-29 or dot-39 pitch shadow mask CRT monitor.  Professional models, in contrast, were sold à la carte with keyboard and mouse bundles chosen by the dealer or sold separately; monitors sold with high-end Macintosh models typically used Trinitron tubes based on aperture grille technology.

While the Performa models resembled their professional counterpart on the system software and hardware level, certain features were tweaked or removed. The Performa 600, for instance, lacked the level-2 cache of the Macintosh IIvx it was based on.

Unlike the professional Macintosh lines, each individual Performa bundle was given a unique model number, in some cases varying only by the software bundle or the specific retailer that sold that model.  This was intended to accommodate retailers, who could advertise that they could beat their competitors' price on equivalent models while at the same time ensuring that they did not actually carry the same models as their competitors.  To help consumers choose between the options available to them, Apple created multiple paid advertisements including "The Martinettis Bring Home a Computer", a thirty-minute "storymercial" about a fictional family that purchases a Performa computer that aired in December 1994.

Apple's strategy for selling Performa machines in department and electronics retail stores did not include the sort of specialized training Apple offered to its dealers.  This resulted in situations where Performa display models were often poorly taken care of; the demo computers crashed, the self-running demo software not running or the display models not even powered on. Apple tried to address the training issue by hiring their own sales people to aid the store sales staff, most of them recruited from Macintosh user groups. Despite this, however, many returned Performa computers could not be serviced properly because the stores were not authorized Apple service centers.

The problem was compounded by retailers favoring Microsoft Windows, especially after the introduction of Windows 95. Computers running Windows were generally cheaper, and encouraged by manufacturer spiffs, advertising co-ops, and other promotion programs. In addition, many stores preferred to sell their own branded white box PCs, something Apple would not allow.

As a consequence of these issues, Apple overestimated demand for Performa machines in 1995 while also underestimating demand for high-end Power Macintosh models, leading to significant oversupply issues.  Introduction of new Performa models slowed as a result: whereas Apple had introduced 20 different Performa models around the world from May to December 1995, the number dropped to four in the first seven months of 1996.

For the late-1996 holiday period, sales of Performa-branded machines had dropped year-over-year by 15 percent, reflective of a company-wide drop in fourth-quarter revenues by one-third compared with 1995.

In February 1997, just days after Steve Jobs returned to the company, Apple refreshed its entire line of desktop computers, retiring a dozen Performa models based on the Power Macintosh 6200 and 6400 with no replacement, and reducing the range of Power Macintosh to six computers (plus a few Apple Workgroup Server variants).  The official end of the Performa brand was announced on March 15 as part of sweeping changes at the company that included layoffs of a third of the company's workforce and the cancellation of several software products.  By early 1998, Apple's lineup was reduced to four computers: One desktop, one all-in-one, and two minitowers (one of which was sold as a server product).  As part of the restructuring of how Apple sold its computers in retail channels, it partnered with CompUSA to implement a "Store within a store" concept.  Apple and related products were displayed and sold in a physically separate location by specialized employees (currently done at select Best Buy stores).

Performa-specific software 
The Performa versions of the Macintosh System software introduced some features that were not available on non-Performa Macintoshes.  The most notable of these are At Ease (parental controls), the Launcher (an application launcher similar to the macOS Dock), and the Performa Control Panel, which included several unique configuration options.  The functionality of all three components were eventually folded into the operating system itself.  Versions of System 7 with the additional software had a 'P' appended to the end, such as 7.1.2P which was included with the Performa 630 in mid-1994.

Software bundles usually included ClarisWorks, Quicken, a calendar/contact manager such as Touchbase and Datebook Pro, America Online, educational software such as American Heritage Dictionary, The New Grolier Multimedia Encyclopedia, TIME Almanac (on models equipped with a CD-ROM drive), Mavis Beacon Teaches Typing, or Mario Teaches Typing, and a selection of games such as Spectre Challenger, Diamonds, and Monopoly.

Another software package that only the Performa was equipped with was called Megaphone, by Cypress Research. MegaPhone is a screen based telephony application (SBT) that provides a powerful way to manage your telephone calls from your computer desktop. In addition to drag-and-drop dialling, callerID display, and call logging, MegaPhone includes features like VoiceMail, TouchTone Navigator, and Smart Speed Dial and facilitates Fax communications via a separate software package included in the Performa.
The MegaPhone Company: MegaPhone 9.0

Timeline

List of Performa models 
Blanks indicate missing data.  

Source:

See also 

 List of Macintosh models grouped by CPU type
 Timeline of Macintosh models

References

External links

 List of Performa and equivalent models

 
Performa